Spy Manor Productions is an independent film production, film production services and consulting company based in Algarve, Portugal, founded in 2019 by Vanda Everke, who also serves as the company's executive producer.

Studio

In 2021, Spy Manor Productions announced a partnership with UK based MovieBox Group to partner in the Movie Box Studios under phased development at the site of the old Unicer factory in Loulé.

Filmography

There's Always Hope

A feature drama starring Colm Meaney and Kate Ashfield.

The Infernal Machine

A psychological thriller starring Guy Pearce.

The worldwide rights for The Infernal Machine were acquired by Paramount Pictures.

Awards

At the 14th ART&TUR - International Tourism Film Festival, Spy Manor Productions received five awards for the promotional video 'Sky Base One’, about a movie inspired villa built in the shape of the Millennium Falcon spaceship from the Star Wars movies.

The awards received were in two categories. In the National Competition: 1st Prize Arts & Creativity; 1st Prize Innovation in Tourism; Best Film Technical Quality. In the international competition:  2nd Prize Arts & Creativity; 1st Prize Innovation in Tourism.

Sponsorships

Spy Manor Productions was a sponsor of the 21st Golden Trailer Awards and is a sponsor of the World Trailer Awards 2022.

References

External links 
 Spy Manor Productions website

Film production companies of Portugal
Film organisations in Portugal